Vintter Lake or Palena Lake is a lake located in Patagonia which is shared by Argentina, where it is known as Lago General Vintter, and by Chile, where it's called Lago Palena. Both names are internationally accepted. The Argentine name is after General Lorenzo Vintter, the second governor of the Argentine Territory of Patagonia (1882–1884), and the first governor of the Territory of the Río Negro (1884–1888).

The Palena River originates at Vintter Lake, where it is locally called Carrenleufú (Greenriver), or in Spanish Rio Corcovado.

Vintter Lake is noted for its fly fishing for brook and rainbow trout, both non-native, introduced species.

Notes and references

Lakes of Chubut Province
Lakes of Chile
Lakes of Los Lagos Region
Argentina–Chile border
International lakes of South America